Gina Chua is a Singaporean journalist serving as the executive editor of the media startup Semafor. She previously served as the executive editor of the Reuters news agency. A trans woman, Chua is one of the most senior openly transgender journalists in the U.S.

Personal life and education 
Born in Singapore, Chua attended high school in the Philippines, studied at the University of Chicago, earning a bachelor's degree in mathematics, and Columbia University, earning a master's degree in journalism. She moved to New York City in 2005. Chua transitioned to female in late 2020.

Career 
Chua worked at the Singapore Broadcasting Corporation and the Straits Times, was a reporter for The Wall Street Journal in Manila and Hanoi, and later served as editor-in-chief of The Wall Street Journal Asia (also known at one point as The Asian Wall Street Journal) and the South China Morning Post. She served as a senior editor for The Wall Street Journal in New York. 

Chua began working as an editor for Reuters in 2011. She was appointed executive editor of the agency in April 2021.

Chua co-founded the Sigma Awards for data journalism with Aron Pilhofer in 2020. She has taught graduate- and undergraduate-level classes and short training courses on the business models of journalism, computer-assisted reporting, and numeracy at New York University, Hong Kong University, and Nanyang Technological University.  She also created and found funding for a fellowship to bring Asian journalists for a Masters’ in business and economic reporting at New York University.

In 2021, Chua was named the inaugural recipient of the Online News Association's Impact Award for "her dedication to innovation in visual storytelling and steadfast commitment to mentor journalists and address structural issues in the industry."

In March 2022, Chua announced she would leave her position as executive editor at Reuters to become the executive editor of Semafor, a new media startup founded by journalist Ben Smith and former Bloomberg Media Group CEO Justin B. Smith.

References

1960s births
Columbia University Graduate School of Journalism alumni
Transgender journalists
Singaporean LGBT people
Living people
Singaporean journalists
Reuters people
Transgender women
University of Chicago alumni
Singaporean women journalists